The Australian Journal of Earth Sciences is a peer-reviewed scientific journal that is published eight times per year by Taylor & Francis on behalf of the Geological Society of Australia. The journal broadly covers the earth sciences. The editor-in-Chief is A.S. Andrew (New South Wales). It was established in 1953 as the Journal of the Geological Society of Australia and obtained its current name in 1984.

Abstracting and indexing  
The journal is abstracted and indexed in:

According to the Journal Citation Reports, the journal has a 2012 impact factor of 1.417.

References

External links 
 

Taylor & Francis academic journals
Publications established in 1984
Geology journals
Earth sciences